Dhatrigram railway station is a railway station on Bandel–Katwa line connecting from  to Katwa, and under the jurisdiction of Howrah railway division of Eastern Railway zone. It is situated at Niralgachhi, Dhatrigram, Purba Bardhaman district in the Indian state of West Bengal. Number of EMU and few Passenger trains stop at Dhatrigram railway station.

History 
The Hooghly–Katwa Railway constructed a line from Bandel to Katwa in 1913. This line including Dhatrigram railway station was electrified in 1994–96 with 25 kV overhead line.

References 

Railway stations in Purba Bardhaman district
Kolkata Suburban Railway stations
Howrah railway division